Sir Roger James Gale (born 20 August 1943) is a British politician who has served as the member of Parliament (MP) for North Thanet since 1983. He had a career in journalism and broadcasting from 1964, around the same time as he joined the Conservative Party, until 1983. He was knighted in 2012. He was a prominent and vocal critic of Boris Johnson during his leadership of the Conservative Party.

Early life and education
Gale was born in Poole, Dorset and was educated at Southbourne Preparatory School and the Hardye's School in Dorchester. He completed his education at the Guildhall School of Music and Drama in 1963.

Broadcasting career
From August 1964 to January 1965 he worked as a radio DJ for Radio Caroline North. 
He worked as a programme director at Radio Scotland from 1965; personal assistant to the general manager of Universal Films from 1971 to 1972;  freelance reporter at BBC Radio London from 1972 to 1973; producer at BBC Radio 1 and then at BBC Radio 4 from 1973 to 1976; became director of BBC Children's Television in 1976 until 1979; then senior producer of children's television and later of special projects at Thames TV from 1979 to 1983.

Political career
Gale joined the Conservative Party in 1964, and was elected as the vice-chairman of the Conservative Association in Holborn and St Pancras in 1971. He was selected to contest Birmingham Northfield at the 1982 by-election caused by the suicide of the sitting Conservative MP Jocelyn Cadbury. He narrowly lost the by-election to Labour's John Spellar by just 289 votes.

He was elected to the House of Commons at the 1983 general election for the newly drawn Kent seat of North Thanet. He gained the seat with a majority of 14,545 and has remained the MP since then. His Labour Party opponent in the 1983 election was Cherie Blair, wife of the future Prime Minister Tony Blair. Gale made his maiden speech in the House of Commons on 30 June 1983.

Gale served as a member of the Home Affairs Select Committee in 1990 and was appointed as the Parliamentary Private Secretary to the successive ministers of state at the Ministry of Defence Archie Hamilton and Jeremy Hanley following the 1992 general election until 1994. He was a member of the broadcasting select committee from between the general elections of 1997 and 2005. He has been a member of the speaker's Panel of Chairmen since 1997. He was a vice chairman of the Conservative Party under the leadership of Iain Duncan Smith from 2001 to 2003 with responsibility for presentation.

In 2008, Gale said that capital punishment was a solution to fatal knife stabbings. He supports the ban on fox hunting. He is also reportedly a eurosceptic, although he opposed Brexit. He has been a member of the Parliamentary Assembly of the Council of Europe since 2010, and currently heads the 18-member British parliamentary delegation to the Assembly.

He is a founding member and current president of Conservative Animal Welfare, a group of Conservative MPs and MEPs. Gale strongly opposed Conservative prime minister David Cameron's introduction of same-sex marriage, stating in the House of Commons: "Marriage is the union between a man and a woman. It is Alice in Wonderland territory, Orwellian almost, for any government of any political persuasion to seek to come along and try to rewrite the lexicon. It will not do."

Gale was opposed to Brexit prior to the 2016 EU membership referendum.

Gale briefly acted as Chairman of Ways and Means at the start of the 58th Parliament.

On 15 September 2020 he was one of two Conservative MPs (together with Andrew Percy) who voted against the UK Internal Market Bill at second reading.

In July 2021, Gale was one of five Conservative MPs found by the Commons Select Committee on Standards to have breached the code of conduct by trying to influence a judge in the trial of former Conservative MP Charlie Elphicke, who was eventually found guilty of three counts of sexual assault and sentenced to two years in prison. Gale was one of three of the group who was also recommended for a one-day suspension by the committee.

On 17 December 2021, following the North Shropshire by-election (when a Conservative majority of nearly 23,000 was overturned leading to a Liberal Democrat win), Gale said, "One more strike and he's (Boris Johnson's) out." Gale said that the by-election, "has to be seen as a referendum on the prime minister's performance". He later revealed he had submitted a letter of no-confidence in Johnson's leadership to the 1922 Committee.

In the wake of the 2022 Russian invasion of Ukraine, Gale called for all Russian nationals living in the UK to be forcibly deported, conceding that some "good and honest" people would be forced to leave. Gale said he had changed his mind on challenging Johnson's leadership following the invasion. He said, "we should not seek to destabilise the government of the United Kingdom". Gale also expressed his "fear" about a leadership election. 

In December 2022 Gale was appointed as temporary Deputy Speaker of the House of Commons in order to cover for the illness of a colleague.

Other activities and roles
He has served as a special constable with the British Transport Police.

He is a past member of the National Union of Journalists.

Honours and awards
Gale was knighted in the 2012 New Year Honours for public and political services. He was appointed to the Privy Council of the United Kingdom in the 2019 New Years Honours List, giving him the honorific title "The Right Honourable" for life.

In February 2016, Gale was nominated for a 'Grassroots Diplomat' award for his involvement in the campaign to save and reopen Manston Airport, which is in his constituency.

Personal life
Gale has been married three times: firstly to Wendy Dawn Bowman in 1964 (marriage dissolved in 1967), without issue; secondly to Susan Linda Sampson in 1971 (marriage dissolved in 1980), with whom he has a daughter; thirdly to Susan Gabrielle Marks, with whom he has two sons.

References

External links 

 
 Roger Gale profile from conservatives.com (archived version from November 2006)
 
 

|-

1943 births
Living people
Conservative Party (UK) MPs for English constituencies
UK MPs 1983–1987
UK MPs 1987–1992
UK MPs 1992–1997
UK MPs 1997–2001
UK MPs 2001–2005
UK MPs 2005–2010
People from Poole
Pirate radio personalities
Offshore radio broadcasters
English television producers
Alumni of the Guildhall School of Music and Drama
British radio journalists
UK MPs 2010–2015
UK MPs 2015–2017
UK MPs 2017–2019
UK MPs 2019–present
Knights Bachelor
Politicians awarded knighthoods
People educated at Hardye's School
Members of the Privy Council of the United Kingdom
British special constables